Kinderhook Township may refer to the following places in the United States:

 Kinderhook Township, Pike County, Illinois
 Kinderhook Township, Michigan

Township name disambiguation pages